Ninth Amendment may refer to the:
Ninth Amendment to the United States Constitution, part of the Bill of Rights
Ninth Amendment of the Constitution of Ireland, extended the right to vote to certain non-citizens
Ninth Amendment of the Constitution of South Africa